Charles Gibson (born 21 June 1961) is a Scottish former footballer who made 240 Scottish League appearances as a centre forward for Dumbarton. He also played in the Scottish League for East Stirlingshire, Clydebank, Stenhousemuir, Stirling Albion and in the Football League for Shrewsbury Town.

Personal life 
As of 2015, Gibson was working as a personnel officer in Helensburgh.

Career statistics

Honours 
Clydebank

 Scottish League Second Division second-place promotion: 1984–85

Dumbarton

 Scottish League Second Division: 1991–92
 Scottish League Second Division second-place promotion: 1994–95

References

1961 births
Scottish footballers
East Stirlingshire F.C. players
Clydebank F.C. (1965) players
Stenhousemuir F.C. players
Stirling Albion F.C. players
Dumbarton F.C. players
Scottish Football League players
Living people
Association football forwards
English Football League players
Shrewsbury Town F.C. players